Simon Patrick Ellis (born ) is a Hong Kong sailor. He competed in the Flying Dutchman event at the 1992 Summer Olympics.

References

External links
 

1963 births
Hong Kong male sailors (sport)
Living people
Olympic sailors of Hong Kong
Place of birth missing (living people)
Sailors at the 1992 Summer Olympics – Flying Dutchman